Anglia was the name of a number of steamships.

PS Anglia (1847), In service with the London and North Western Railway until 1861.
, In service with the London and North Western Railway until requisitioned for use as a hospital ship in 1914. Mined and sunk on 17 November 1915.
TSS Anglia (1920), In service with the London and North Western Railway and London, Midland and Scottish Railway until 1935.
 a Hansa A type cargo ship in service 1957–74.

Ship names